Reginald Mount (1906–1979) was a British graphic designer.

Mount was born Edward Reginald Mount, on 4 July 1906. He worked as a designer for various advertising agencies in London in the 1930s, then joined the Ministry of Information at the outbreak of the Second World War.

Throughout the war, Mount worked extensively with the designer Eileen Evans. Together, they produced many posters for the Ministry's public awareness and propaganda campaigns, including their renowned anti-venereal disease campaign of 1943–1944. Other designer colleagues in the Ministry of Information's "general division" included Maurice V. Bennett and Kenneth Bird, better known as the cartoonist 'Fougasse'. Their work was overseen by the Ministry's studio manager, Edwin Embleton.

Some time after 1941, he worked on a series of posters probably intended for export to the Soviet Union (they were accompanied by Russian text). The example pictured shows a hand, representing the merchant navy carrying a Hawker Hurricane to the USSR, to reinforce the Soviet air force. Several of his wartime works depict an anthropomorphised, cartoon-style incendiary bomb, 'Fire-bomb Fritz'.

Mount was subsequently a founding member of the Artist Partners agency, which was established in 1950 by the agent Donovan Candler in Lower John Street, Soho, London.

Mount continued to work in partnership with Eileen Evans. In the 1950s and 1960s, their 'Mount/Evans studio' became closely associated with the post-war Central Office of Information, producing designs for a wide variety of government agencies. Mount also designed the cinema poster for the British comedy film The Ladykillers.

His work is in collections including those of The National Archives, The Science Museum, and the Victoria and Albert Museum.

Mount died on 31 January 1979.

References 

Darracott, J. and Loftus, B., Second World War Posters, 1981 (1972), p. 47

External links 

Works in the Victoria and Albert Museum
Cigarettes, Germs and Paper - blog post with images and biography

1906 births
1979 deaths
British graphic designers
Film poster artists
Propaganda art